The Simplício Hydroelectric Complex is located on the Paraíba do Sul river on the border of Rio de Janeiro and Minas Gerais states in Brazil. Supported by the Anta Dam, it transfers water through a  circuit to a downstream power plant. After years of delay and a cost of US$2 billion, the power complex became operational in June 2013.

Background
Construction on the complex began in January 2007 after the Brazilian Institute of Environment and Renewable Natural Resources (IBAMA) issued an installation permit. One goal of the project is to reduce environmental impacts created by large reservoirs. On August 5, 2009, the river was diverted through the Anta Dam's spillway. The rate progress is such that the completion of construction is on schedule for commissioning in 2013. The Anta Dam began to impound its reservoir in late February 2013. All three generators went into operation by early June 2013. The project was completed almost three years behind schedule. Delays were attributed to increased costs, lengthy permit approvals and a court decision which delayed the Anta Reservoir from being filled.

Operation
At the end of the circuit, the water is fed to a power station containing 3 x  Francis turbines. The Anta Dam itself supports a  power station with 2 x Kaplan turbine-powered generators.

Water from T2A enters a valley and with the assistance of two dikes, creates Louriçal reservoir. The Calçado reservoir uses an outlet works to remove any excess water from the reservoir and help maintain appropriate levels.

The penstocks provide  of hydraulic head and are at a 12.48 percent angle.

Popular culture
The project was featured on Build It Bigger during a season 8 episode.

References

External links

Energy infrastructure completed in 2013
Hydroelectric power stations in Brazil
Roller-compacted concrete dams
Dams in Rio de Janeiro (state)
Dams in Minas Gerais